All Else Failed may refer to:
 All Else Failed (1995 album), an album by Zao
 All Else Failed (2003 album), an album by Zao